The Kemmlitzbach is a river of Saxony, Germany. It is a left tributary of the Lausitzer Neiße, which it joins in Hirschfelde near Zittau.

See also
List of rivers of Saxony

Rivers of Saxony
Upper Lusatia
Rivers of Germany